Edwin Riley (21 March 1867 – 4 May 1936) was an English cricketer. Riley's batting and bowling styles are unknown.  He was born at Stoney Stanton, Leicestershire.

Riley made two first-class appearances for Leicestershire in 1895, against Lancashire at Old Trafford, and Dublin University at Grace Road.  Against Lancashire, he made scores of 8 not out in Leicestershire's first-innings, and a single run in their second, during which he was dismissed by Arthur Mold.  Against Dublin University, Riley scored 4 runs in Leicestershire's first-innings, before being dismissed by Ernest Ensor, while in their second-innings he wasn't required to bat.

He died at the village of his birth on 4 May 1936.

References

External links

1867 births
1936 deaths
People from Stoney Stanton
Cricketers from Leicestershire
English cricketers
Leicestershire cricketers